Eduardo de Sousa Santos (born 17 January 1999), better known as Eduardo Kau, is a Brazilian footballer who plays as a defender.

Club career
On 4 July 2019, Kau signed his first professional contract with Belenenses SAD. Kau made his professional debut with in a 0-0 Primeira Liga tie with Portimonense S.C. on 9 August 2019.

References

External links

ZeroZero Profile

1999 births
Living people
Footballers from Brasília
Brazilian footballers
Association football defenders
Belenenses SAD players
Primeira Liga players
Brazilian expatriate footballers
Expatriate footballers in Portugal
Brazilian expatriate sportspeople in Portugal